Margarites simbla, common name the beehive margarite, is a species of sea snail, a marine gastropod mollusk in the family Margaritidae.

References

External links
 To Encyclopedia of Life
 To USNM Invertebrate Zoology Mollusca Collection
 To ITIS
 To World Register of Marine Species

simbla
Gastropods described in 1913